Nyaluk T. Gatluak is a South Sudanese politician. He is the current Minister for Animal Resources and Fisheries in the Cabinet of South Sudan. He was appointed to that position on 10 July 2011.

See also
 SPLM
 SPLA
 Cabinet of South Sudan

References

External links
Website of Government of South Sudan

Living people
Government ministers of South Sudan
Year of birth missing (living people)